Project Mutual Telephone Company has provided continuous telephone service in the Mini-Cassia area in Idaho since 1916. When PMT was organized with 34 telephone customers, it based its future on providing quality service to its members. In 1956, PMT installed its first local direct dial telephone system. The system served approximately 1,700 customers and was state-of-the-art technology for the time. In 1962 direct dial long distance was added. The 1970s and 1980s produced continued growth for PMT; the information age was in full swing and again PMT responded by adding updated technologies; the first digital central office in Idaho, fiber optic cable and expanded features were added for continued member satisfaction. By the end of 1983, all of PMT’s systems were interconnected through a completely digital network.

In the late 1990s, service was expanded into Burley, Oakley and Heyburn. Today, PMT is a full-service communication company, providing local and long distance telephone service, dial-up, high-speed DSL and wireless internet as well as cable television and IPTV. In 2004, PMT expanded its network into Twin Falls, and now serves several anchor businesses in the area and several residential customers on the canyon rim. PMT proudly added Syringa Wireless as a cellular partner in 2006.

Today PMT serves over 12,000 members throughout the Magic Valley in Idaho and employs 75 full-time employees.

Telecommunications companies of the United States